Colonsay is an island north of Islay in Scotland.

Colonsay may also refer to:
 Colonsay, Saskatchewan, a Canadian town
 Rural Municipality of Colonsay No. 342, Saskatchewan, a municipality

See also
 Little Colonsay, an island west of the Isle of Mull, Scotland